William Henry Dudley III (January 15, 1931 – January 18, 1978) was an American competition swimmer who represented the United States as a 17-year-old at the 1948 Summer Olympics in London.  Dudley swam for the gold medal-winning U.S. team in the preliminary heats of the men's 4×200-meter freestyle relay.  He did not receive a medal, however, because under the rules in effect in 1948, only those relay swimmers who competed in the event final were eligible.

William Dudley graduated from Castle Heights Military Academy in Lebanon, Tennessee and then attended Tulane University, graduating in 1953 with a degree in mechanical engineering.  He competed for Tulane at the club level, as they had no varsity swimming, and the New Orleans Athletic Club.

In 1965 Dudley founded Dudley Engineering Co., a manufacturer's representative for HVAC equipment, which was the business he operated until his death at a young age.  He was a member of the American Society of Heating, Refrigerating and Air Conditioning Engineers; the Manufacturers Agents National Association; and the New Orleans Chamber of Commerce.

References

1931 births
1978 deaths
American male freestyle swimmers
Olympic swimmers of the United States
Sportspeople from New Orleans
Swimmers at the 1948 Summer Olympics
Tulane University alumni
20th-century American people